Brampoque Serra Silva Sá (born 16 November 1996) known as Brash,  is a Guinea-Bissauan footballer who plays for Dunston UTS, as a midfielder.

Football career
On 29 July 2017, Brash made his debut with Real in a 2017–18 Taça da Liga match against Belenenses.

On 27 August 2022, Brash made his debut for Dunston UTS in a 2022–23 Northern Premier League match against Worksop Town.

References

External links

Portuguese League profile 

1996 births
Living people
Bissau-Guinean footballers
Association football midfielders